Abass Alavi is an Iranian-American physician-scientist specializing in the field of molecular imaging, most notably in the imaging modality of positron emission tomography (PET). In August 1976, he was part of the team that performed the first human PET studies of the brain and whole body using the radiotracer [18F]Fluorodeoxyglucose (FDG). Alavi holds the position of Professor of Radiology and Neurology, as well as Director of Research Education in the Department of Radiology at the University of Pennsylvania. Over a career spanning five decades, he has amassed over 2,300 publications and 60,000 citations, earning an h-index of 125 and placing his publication record in the top percentile of scientists.

Early life and education
Abass Alavi was born in Tabriz, the largest city in northwestern Iran. After graduating from high school in Tabriz, Alavi moved to Tehran and received his medical degree from the Tehran University of Medical Sciences in 1964. He began his training in internal medicine at the Albert Einstein Medical Center and the Philadelphia VA Hospital in 1966. Following subspecialization in hematology/oncology at the University of Pennsylvania, Alavi started his education in medical imaging by enrolling in the radiology department at the Harvard-affiliated Beth Israel Deaconess Medical Center. He joined the University of Pennsylvania School of Medicine in 1971 as a research fellow in nuclear medicine, and was soon appointed to the faculty. He currently holds appointments as Professor and Director of Research Education in the  Department of Radiology.

 1964: Medical doctorate(MD), University of Tehran, School of Medicine	
 1966: Intern, Rotating Internal Medicine, A. Einstein Medical Center, Philadelphia	
 1968: Resident, Internal Medicine, VA Medical Center	
 1969: Fellow, Hematology- Oncology, Hospital of the University of Pennsylvania	
 1970:	Resident, Radiology, Beth Israel Deaconess Medical Center, Boston

Later life and career

Alavi began his work in tomographic imaging under the guidance of Dr. David Kuhl. He and his colleagues at the University of Pennsylvania were pioneers in performing modern tomographic imaging by utilizing single gamma emitting radionuclides (Single Photon Emission Computer Tomography/SPECT). In 1973, he—along with his colleagues Dr. Kuhl and Dr. Martin Reivich—were the first scientists to conceive the idea of labeling deoxyglucose with positron-emitting fluoride (F-18), leading to the development of FDG. In August 1976, Alavi became the first to administer FDG to a human being and acquire tomographic images of the brain and whole body. He was also among the first to utilize Iodine-123 in the diagnosis of thyroid cancer, MIBG in the assessment of pheochromocytoma, radiolabled WBCs in the evaluation of infection, and 99mTc in the detection of gastrointestinal bleeds, among a host of other discoveries.

Alavi has been associated with the University of Pennsylvania for all of his career, beginning with a fellowship in Nuclear Medicine in 1971–1973. He was promoted to professor of radiology in 1982, and served as chief of the Division of Nuclear Medicine from 1979 to 2006. Since then, he has been the director of research education in the Department of Radiology.

Alavi has performed numerous research studies utilizing FDG since its inception. Furthermore, soon after the introduction of CT in the early '70s and MRI in the early '80s, Alavi has conducted research that combines PET with these imaging modalities.  He is an expert in modern imaging techniques and the clinical applications of PET imaging for the detection of cancer and other disorders including dementia, seizures, cardiovascular disease, and infection.

Alavi served as a member and chairman of scientific study sections at the NIH and American Cancer Society. He has trained and mentored countless students in modern imaging techniques, and many of his former students and research fellows now occupy leadership positions in medical imaging across the world.

 1971-1973:		 Fellow, Nuclear Medicine, Hospital of the University of Pennsylvania, Philadelphia
 1973-1974:		 Instructor in Radiology, Dept. of Radiology, Univ. of Pennsylvania School of Medicine
 1974-1977:		 Assistant Professor Radiology, Dept. of Radiology, Univ. of Pennsylvania School of Medicine
 1977-1982:		 Associate Professor of Radiology, Dept. of Radiology, Univ. of Pennsylvania School of Medicine
 1979-2006:		 Chief, Division of Nuclear Medicine, Hospital of the University of Pennsylvania
 1979-1991:		 Co-director, Positron Emission Tomography Center, University of Pennsylvania
 1991-2006:	 Medical Director, Positron Emission Tomography Center, University of Pennsylvania
 1982–present:	 Professor of Radiology, Department of Radiology, University of Pennsylvania School of Medicine
 1984–present:    Associate Director, Center for the Study of Aging, University of Pennsylvania
 2006–present:     Director of Research Education, Department of Radiology, University of Pennsylvania

PET

Positron emission tomography (PET) is a medical imaging technique that produces a three-dimensional image of molecular processes in the body. The system detects pairs of gamma rays emitted as a result of the annihilation of positrons emitted from radionuclides (tracers), which are used to label biologically active molecules.

One of the factors most responsible for the widespread adoption of positron imaging was the development of radiopharmaceuticals. In particular, the development of labeled 2-Fludeoxyglucose (18F) (2FDG) through the collaboration between scientists at the Brookhaven National Laboratory and investigators at the University of Pennsylvania, was a major factor in expanding the scope of PET imaging. The compound was first administered to two normal human volunteers by Alavi in August 1976 at the University of Pennsylvania.

In 1999, after decades of research demonstrating the unique and versatile utility of PET and the functional data it provides, the modality was approved for reimbursement by the Centers for Medicare and Medicaid Services (CMS) and rapidly became a cornerstone of the evaluation of a host of diseases, most notably cancers.

It is now well established that without the introduction of FDG to medicine, the field of molecular imaging with PET would have been confined to major research institutions, precluding its current widespread clinical applications. In addition, FDG has resulted in the exploration of numerous biologically important compounds in research and drug development.

Awards, honors and membership in honorary societies

Alavi is the recipient of many awards and distinctions, among which are the highest distinctions in nuclear medicine: the Georg Charles de Hevesy Nuclear Pioneer Award  given by the Society of Nuclear Medicine, the Cassen Prize of the Society of Nuclear Medicine, and  honorary degrees from the University of Bologna, the University of the Sciences in Philadelphia and Shiraz University in Iran. The de Hevesy Award  from the Society of Nuclear Medicine was given to Alavi for his pioneering work in the development of positron emission tomography.

He is an internationally renowned expert in modern imaging techniques and in the clinical applications of PET imaging for the detection of cancer as well as neurological, cardiovascular, and infectious disorders.

 1971-73:		Postdoctoral NIH Fellowship in Nuclear Medicine
 1982: 	Member, Steering and Executive Committees, Prospective Investigation of Pulmonary Embolism Diagnosis,Chairman, Nuclear Medicine Working Group
 1984:			Who's Who, Frontiers of Science and Technology
 1984-88:		Trustee, Society of Nuclear Medicine
 1985:			Fellow of the Center for the Study of Aging, University of Pennsylvania
 1985:                 Fellow, American College of Nuclear Physicians
 1992:			Fred Joliot visiting professor at Orsay, France
 1992:			Evan-Jone Memorial Lecture, U of MDS, London
 1994:			IVRA - Keynote speaker
 1994:			Taylor Lectureship award - Dept. of Psychiatry, University of Maryland
 1995:			Benedict Cassen Memorial Symposium, CA
 1996:			6th Asia & Oceania Congress - award for Outstanding Contributions
 1997:			Sarabhai Memorial Oration award - Society of Nuclear Medicine of India
 1999:			The 11th Annual Berson-Yalow Award - Greater NY Chapter Society of Nuclear Medicine
 1999:			Best Doctors in America
 2001:	One of two Finalists, "Most influential Radiology Researchers, AuntMinnie.com's Annual Event to recognize Excellence in Radiology 
 2001:	Distinguished Service Award, Indo-American Society of Nuclear Medicine , IASNM, for outstanding contribution to nuclear medicine and promotion of IASNM
 2001:                      member, American Board of Nuclear Medicine
 2001:                      Taplin Pioneer Award in Nuclear Medicine
 2004:                      Georg Charles de Hevesy Nuclear Pioneer Award, 51st Annual Meeting of the    Society  of Nuclear Medicine
 2005:			Member, (Ad Hoc Chairman), NIH/CSR/ZRG1 SBIB-Q50
 2005:				Chairman, NIH/CSR/ZRG1 SBIB-Q13
 2006:                Mentor of the Year Award, American College of Nuclear Medicine Physicians 
 2006:                    Fellow, World Innovation Foundation 
 2007: 		Honorary Doctoral Degree (Laurea ad honorem, Medicina e Chirurgia), University of Bolognia, Italy
 2007:			Honorary PhD Degree in Molecular Biology, University of Shiraz
 2007:				Member, Honorary Editorial Board, Drug Design, Development and Therapy
 2008:	               Member, Honorary Editorial Board, Journal of Receptor, Ligand and Channel Research, Dove Medical Press
 2008:			Life Member, American Board of Nuclear Medicine
 2008:                      Honorary Doctoral Degree (DSc), University of the Sciences  in Philadelphia
 2008:				The most published and most cited faculty at PENN
 2010:			Member, College of CSR Reviewers, National Institute of Health
 2011:			Editor-in-Chief, Current Molecular Imaging
 2012:			Organizing Committee Member, International Conference & Exhibition on Personalized Medicine and Molecular Diagnostics
 2012:			Benedict Cassen Prize for Research in Nuclear Medicine, Annual Meeting of the SNM
 2015: recipient of Gold Medal of City of Tabriz, Tabriz, Iran
 2015: recipient of gold medal of National Institute for Medical Research Development, Tehran, Iran

Other appearances
Alavi has been a long-time supporter of educational and research opportunities for students in nuclear medicine. While his name is associated with the Alavi-Mandell Awards, which recognize trainees and young scientists who publish articles as senior authors in the Journal of Nuclear Medicine, he also supports the Pilot Research Grants and the Bradley-Alavi Student Fellowship Awards. Bradley-Alavi Fellows are named in honor of the late Stanley E. Bradley, a professor of medicine at Columbia University College of Physicians and Surgeons and a prominent researcher in the fields of renal physiology and liver disease, and Abass Alavi, M.D., professor of radiology and chief of the division of nuclear medicine at the University of Pennsylvania Medical Center. funded by the Education and Research Foundation of the Society of Nuclear Medicine. In 2021 Alavi co-founded Bashir-Alavi Award with Humayun Bashir for the best cancer related research publication from Pakistan. This award is announced annually at the Shaukat Khanum Cancer Symposium.

References

External links
Biography

University of Pennsylvania faculty
Living people
Year of birth missing (living people)
Physicians from Tabriz
Iranian emigrants to the United States
Iranian expatriate academics
University of Tehran alumni
Iranian nuclear medicine physicians